The 1945 Soviet Chess Championship was the 14th edition of USSR Chess Championship. Held from 1 June to 3 July 1945 in Moscow. The tournament was won by Mikhail Botvinnik.

Tables and results

References 

USSR Chess Championships
Championship
Chess
1945 in chess
Chess